Shanker Dev Campus is one of the constituent campuses of Tribhuvan University in Pradashani Marg, in Kathmandu. The campus was established in 1951.

The campus runs programs in bachelor's and master's degrees in business studies. The campus was initiated to focus on the field of management. The academic departments in the campus are sub-divided into management, accounting, finance, marketing, and economics. It has different programs such as BBS, MBS, BBA, BIM, MBM and BBM in different shifts (morning, day, evening).

History
The campus was established in 1951 as Nepal National College running from Durbar High School and later from Tri-Chandra College. The campus was renamed and  amalgamated into Tribhuvan University in 1973 following a government decision. The campus is named after Prof. Shanker Dev Pant, who initiated to build the infrastructure for the campus.

Associations
The college has teachers' and students' associations, namely Tribhuvan University Teachers Association and Free Student Union, which were established for the rights and welfare of the teachers and students, respectively.

References

Tribhuvan University
1951 establishments in Nepal